Malpensa Aeroporto Terminal 2 is a railway station serving Terminal 2 of Milan-Malpensa Airport. It opened in 2016 with the 3.4 kilometer railway extension from the Terminal 1 railway station, thus becoming the western terminus of the Busto Arsizio–Malpensa Airport railway, managed by Ferrovienord.

Train services
The train services are operated by Trenord and TILO and run on a clock-face schedule:

 Trenord Malpensa Express: Malpensa Airport T2-Malpensa Airport T1-Saronno-Milan Cadorna/Milan Centrale, with quarter-hourly frequency (2 trains per hour to Cadorna, 2 to Centrale)
 TILO S50: Malpensa Airport T2-Malpensa Airport T1-Gallarate-Varese-Mendrisio-Lugano-Bellinzona, with hourly frequency

References

External links
 

Airport railway stations in Italy
Ferrovienord stations
Railway stations in Lombardy
Railway stations opened in 2016